The 2006 AFC Women's Championship qualification is the qualification for the 2006 AFC Women's Asian Cup football competition. All matches were played at the My Dinh Stadium, Hanoi. The two top teams in each group qualified for the play-off stage. This was the first ever AFC qualifiers for the Women's Asian Cup in the history, having previously only invited teams to take part.

First round

Group A

Group B

Group C

Group D

 Singapore advanced on a coin toss.

Second round
The winners of each match qualified for the main tournament.

Qualified teams
The following four teams qualified for the final tournament.

Bold indicates champions for that year. Italic indicates hosts for that year.

References

2006 qualification
qualification
Afc
2005
2005 in Vietnamese football